Gap: The Series (Tritseedee See Chompoo, lit. Pink Theory) is a 2022–2023 Thai romantic comedy series starring Sarocha Chankimha and Rebecca Patricia Armstrong. Adapted from the novel of the same name by Devil Planoy (เจ้าปลาน้อย), it is directed by Nuttapong Wongkaveepairoj, and produced by IDOLFACTORY. It aired every Saturdays from November 19, 2022 to February 11, 2023 on Channel 3 and IDOLFACTORY YouTube channel. 

Gap is Thailand's first girl love series. Due to its immense popularity, the series is considered as paving the way for the GL genre. It surpassed 300 million views on YouTube in just 3 months.

Synopsis 
Ever since Sam (Sarocha Chankimha) came to her aid years ago, Mon (Rebecca Patricia Armstrong) has always considered the former as her role model. When Mon graduated, she decided to apply for a job at Sam’s company, yet Sam's distant and icy exterior surprised her. The more she got closer to Sam, her feelings gradually changed from idolizing to love, and things took a better turn when Sam realized she felt the same way. However, between them lies many obstacles like gender barriers, the 8-year age gap, and social class as Sam is a royal descendant.

Cast

Main 

 Sarocha Chankimha as “Sam” Samanan Anantrakul
 Rebecca Patricia Armstrong as “Mon” Kornkamon
 Tassawan Seneewongse as Sam's grandmother
 Asavarid Pinitkanjanapun as Kirk

Supporting 

 Orntara Poolsak as Jim
 Urassaya Malaiwong as Yuki
 Ratchanon Kanpiang as Nop
 Punnisa Sirisang as Kade
 Natnicha Vorrakittikun as Tee
 Sawaros Nekkham as Neung
 Potida Boomee as Song
 Jirawat Wachirasarunpat as Aon
 Amata Piyavanich as Pohn
 Thongthong Mokjok as Mhee
 Suttatip Wutchaipradit as Noi
 Natsinee Charoensitthisap as Yha
 Chirapathr Pingkanont as Chin

Guest 

 Suppapong Udomkaewkanjana as Phum
 Amanda Jensen as Nita
 Sulax Siriphattharapong as Cher
 Praiya Padungsuk as Risa
 Patchanon Ounsa-ard as Billy
 Wichai Saefant as Seng

Production 
Gap was announced as the first GL series in Thailand. The project was launched on August 22, 2021 along with the main cast confirmation. Casting to find other actors for supporting roles was held on November 13, 2021. 

Unfortunately, after the release of Trailer Pilot on May 14, 2022, the series received negative feedback on social media. The production team had to readjust the script, costumes, as well as changes to shooting locations, which prompted filming to be postponed until June 20, 2022. Filming finally wrapped up on October 22, 2022.

Original soundtrack

Awards and nominations

References 

2022 Thai television series debuts
Thai drama television series
Thai LGBT-related television shows
2020s LGBT-related television series